Meow Meow may refer to:
 Melissa Madden Gray, Australian cabaret performer, stage name Meow Meow
 "Meow Meow", song from the soundtrack of the 2009 Tamil film Kanthaswamy 
 Mephedrone, a synthetic stimulant

See also
 Meow (disambiguation)